House at 362 Sea Cliff Avenue is a historic home located at Sea Cliff in Nassau County, New York.  It was built about 1875 and expanded in 1890.  It consists of a three-bay, 2-story main section with a mansard roof and -story gable-roofed wing in the Second Empire style.  It features a shed-roofed porch with scrollsawn corner brackets.

It was listed on the National Register of Historic Places in 1988.

References

Houses on the National Register of Historic Places in New York (state)
Second Empire architecture in New York (state)
Houses completed in 1875
Houses in Nassau County, New York
National Register of Historic Places in Nassau County, New York